Carina Garland is an Australian politician. She has served as a Labor MP for Chisholm since the 2022 Australian federal election.

Early life and education
Garland was raised in the southeastern suburbs of Melbourne, and currently lives in Clayton. Garland has an English literature honours degree from Monash University and a PhD in gender and cultural studies from the University of Sydney.

Political career
Before her election to the Australian House of Representatives, Garland served as the assistant secretary for the Victorian Trades Hall Council, as well as a parliamentary staffer. Garland was preselected to stand in Chisholm for Labor at the 2022 federal election in July 2021, and won the seat with an 8.1-point swing in her direction, defeating Liberal incumbent Gladys Liu. In the Labor caucus, Garland is a member of the Labor Left faction.

References

Members of the Australian House of Representatives
Australian Labor Party members of the Parliament of Australia
Living people
Members of the Australian House of Representatives for Chisholm
21st-century Australian politicians
21st-century Australian women politicians
Women members of the Australian House of Representatives
Year of birth missing (living people)
Australian trade unionists
Labor Left politicians